The 1889 Rutgers Queensmen football team represented Rutgers University as an independent during the 1889 college football season. The Queensmen compiled a 1–4 record and were outscored their opponents, 92 to 22. The team had no coach, and its captain was James Bishop, Jr.

Schedule

References

Rutgers
Rutgers Scarlet Knights football seasons
Rutgers Queensmen football